SIMBAD (the Set of Identifications, Measurements and Bibliography for Astronomical Data) is an astronomical database of objects beyond the Solar System. It is maintained by the Centre de données astronomiques de Strasbourg (CDS), France.

SIMBAD was created by merging the Catalog of Stellar Identifications (CSI) and the Bibliographic Star Index as they existed at the Meudon Computer Centre until 1979, and then expanded by additional source data from other catalogues and the academic literature. The first on-line interactive version, known as Version 2, was made available in 1981.
Version 3, developed in the C language and running on UNIX stations at the Volgograd Observatory, was released in 1990. Fall of 2006 saw the release of Version 4 of the database, now stored in PostgreSQL, and the supporting software, now written entirely in Java.

JP11 is a star catalogue containing about 4,000 objects. Currently it exists only as a part of the SIMBAD database.

, SIMBAD contains information for 5,800,000 stars and about 5,500,000 nonstellar objects (galaxies, planetary nebulae, clusters, novae and supernovae, etc.)

The minor planet 4692 SIMBAD was named in its honour.

See also 
 Planetary Data System (PDS) – NASA's  database of information on SSSB, maintained by JPL and Caltech.
 NASA/IPAC Extragalactic Database (NED) – a database of information on objects outside the Milky Way, also maintained by JPL.
 NASA Exoplanet Archive – an online astronomical exoplanet catalog and data service.

References

External links 
 
 
 SIMBAD database search page

Astronomical databases
Astronomy websites
Centre de données astronomiques de Strasbourg